Mount Royal is a mountain in Schoharie County, New York. It is located south-southwest of West Conesville. Sicklers Mountain is located east and Stevens Mountain is located north of Mount Royal.

References

Royal
Mountains of New York (state)